Bruce Belfrage (30 October 1900 – August 1974) was an English actor and BBC radio newsreader. He was casting director at the BBC between 1936 and 1939, and founded the BBC Repertory Company in 1939.

Early life
Bruce Belfrage was born in Marylebone, London, the son of Sydney Henning Belfrage and Frances Grace (née Powley). His younger brother was the author and journalist Cedric Belfrage. He was educated at Gresham's School before taking an honours degree in modern languages at St John's College, Oxford.

Career
Belfrage is reported as performing on stage in London with The Strolling Players in February 1923. He played in a notable triumph—A Sleeping Clergyman—with Robert Donat in 1933 and in BBC radio plays in 1934. He appeared in his first film in 1932. He was a broadcaster in the early days of 2LO at Savoy Hill, and in 1935 joined the BBC as a casting director and later became a news reader and announcer.

In a famous incident on 15 October 1940, the BBC's Broadcasting House took a direct hit from a delayed-action German bomb, which eventually exploded during the nine o'clock radio news read by Belfrage. Seven people were killed, and Belfrage, covered with plaster and soot, carried on reading the news as if nothing had happened. Listeners at home heard just a dull thud. He enlisted in the Royal Naval Reserve in 1942, and was demobilized with the rank of lieutenant-commander.

Belfrage was an unsuccessful Liberal candidate for the South Buckinghamshire division at the 1950 general election. He polled 16.5%, and never contested another election.

Migration to Australia
In September 1958, for health reasons, Belfrage migrated to Australia with his second wife Joyce, a TV producer. They lived in Melbourne for seven months and transferred to Sydney in 1959. Joyce Belfrage quit the ABC in 1962 to work in the advertising industry and initiate a programme of media studies at Macquarie University.

Death
Bruce Belfrage died in Sydney at the age of 73. He was married to the actress Joan Henley, with whom he had a son, Julian Rochfort Belfrage. After his divorce from Henley, Belfrage married Joyce Belfrage.

Filmography
C.O.D.. (1932) - Philip
The Scarlet Pimpernel (1934) - Pitt
Too Many Millions (1934)
Full Circle (1935) - Clyde Warren
War Front (1941) - Newspaper editor
Hue and Cry (1947) - BBC announcer
Man on the Run (1948) - BBC Newscaster
I Killed the Count (1948) - Viscount Sorrington
Corridor of Mirrors (1948) - Sir David Conway
Black Magic (1949) - Crown Prosecutor
Warning to Wantons (1949) - Archimandrite
Ten Little Niggers (1949) - Sir Lawrence Wargrave
The Case of Charles Peace (1949) - Prosecution Counsel
Miss Pilgrim's Progress (1950) - Manager
Mister Drake's Duck (1951) - Air Vice Marshal
Home to Danger (1951) - Solicitor
The Galloping Major (1951) - Himself/Radio Commentator
 Never Look Back (1952) - Judge

Publication
One Man In His Time, by Bruce Belfrage.  Published by Hodder & Stoughton, London, 1951

References

External links 
 Bruce Belfrage at the National Portrait Gallery 
 
 Audio of Bruce Belfrage reading the news

1900 births
1974 deaths
Male actors from London
English male stage actors
English male film actors
People educated at Gresham's School
Alumni of St John's College, Oxford
Liberal Party (UK) parliamentary candidates
20th-century English male actors
Royal Navy officers of World War II
Royal Naval Volunteer Reserve personnel of World War II
Royal Naval Reserve personnel